Hewlett is a station on the Long Island Rail Road's Far Rockaway Branch in Hewlett, in Nassau County, New York, United States. The station is located at Franklin Avenue between Broadway and West Broadway.

History
Hewlett station was originally built by the South Side Railroad of Long Island as Cedar Grove station in July 1869. This name would only last until October, when it was changed to Hewletts station. In 1870, the station was replaced with a new building, that has remained intact ever since, making it the oldest railroad station on Long Island, and the only existing building constructed by an LIRR predecessor. High-level sheltered platforms were added across Franklin Avenue during the late-1990s, and a new station house was built diagonally across the grade crossing from the original one between November 25, 2002 and July 28, 2003. After the LIRR built the new Hewlett Station, the oldest active station became the 1873-built Saint James on the Port Jefferson Branch in Suffolk County. Today the former SSRLI Depot is owned by the Long Island Rail Road, but leased to a local taxi company.

Station layout
This station has two high-level side platforms. The east platform (adjacent to Track 1) is 10 cars long and the west platform (adjacent to Track 2) is eight cars long.

References

External links 

Old Hewlett Station (Arrt's Arrchives)
Unofficial LIRR History Website
View of old station from parking lot and from tracks
Hewlett Station (Great Railroad Stations -- TrainWeb)
 Station from Franklin Avenue from Google Maps Street View
 Platforms from Google Maps Street View

Five Towns
Long Island Rail Road stations in Nassau County, New York
Railway stations in the United States opened in 1869
1869 establishments in New York (state)